Suparman is a given name. Notable persons with this name as a patrynomic (which may become a surname in the West) include:
 Suparman (1913-1948), first minister of justice of Pasundan
 Aang Suparman (born 1984), Indonesian footballer
 Rusdi Suparman (born 1973), Malaysian footballer

See also
 Superman (disambiguation)